The House of Oettingen is a high-rank noble Franconian and Swabian family. It ruled various estates that composed the County of Oettingen between the 12th century and the beginning of the 19th century. In 1674 the house was raised to the rank of prince for the first time. Despite the annexation of their lands following the German mediatisation of 1806, the family retained their titles and still have representatives today.

Origins
 
These are also considered to be the ancestors of the Staufers.

The relationship between the family and the Hohenstaufens is also proven by documents. The family built Steinsberg Castle around 1200 as vassals of the Hohenstaufen dynasty

From the 12th to the 14th century the family gained the largest secular territory in East Swabia. The county of Oettingen lay around the imperial city of Nördlingen in present-day Bavaria or Baden-Württemberg.

Main branches

From 1410, the county started its first divisions within the family, as noted below. Following the partitions, the remaining land was called Oettingen-Oettingen and was located in modern-day eastern Baden-Württemberg and western Bavaria. This branch was Protestant, created Prince of the Holy Roman Empire in 1674 but became extinct in 1731, when the county was divided and inherited by Oettingen-Spielberg (Princes since 1734) that obtained the town and castle of Oettingen, and Oettingen-Wallerstein (Princes since 1774).

Wallerstein

Oettingen-Wallerstein is a noble family related to a former County in modern-day eastern Baden-Württemberg and western Bavaria, Germany.

Oettingen-Wallerstein was twice created; first as a partition of Oettingen (modern day town of Oettingen in Bayern) in 1423 which became extinct in 1486 and was inherited by Oettingen-Oettingen, and the second time as a partition of Oettingen-Oettingen in 1557, as a Catholic branch of the family. Oettingen-Oettingen suffered one partition, between itself and Oettingen-Spielberg in 1602. It was raised to a Principality in 1774 by Joseph II, Holy Roman Emperor. In 1806, it was mediatised to the Kingdom of Bavaria, and divided with the Kingdom of Württemberg in 1810.

Spielberg
Oettingen-Spielberg is a noble family and former principality in modern-day eastern Baden-Württemberg and western Bavaria, Germany. It was partitioned of Oettingen-Wallerstein in 1602. It was raised to a Principality in 1734 (after it inherited the town and the castle of Oettingen in 1731), mediatised to the Kingdom of Bavaria in 1806, and divided with the Kingdom of Württemberg in 1810. The other still existing branch of the Oettingen family is the House of Oettingen-Wallerstein.

Baldern
Oettingen-Baldern was a line of the Swabian-Franconian noble house of Oettingen. It was created by dividing the Oettingen-Alt-Wallerstein line in 1623. The Counts of Oettingen-Baldern died out in 1789. The possessions including Baldern Castle and Katzenstein Castle as well as the Sötern lordship went over to the Oettingen-Wallerstein line.

Rulers

House of Oettingen

Partitions of Oettingen under Oettingen family

Table of rulers

Lines of succession (post-mediatisation)

Mediatized line of Wallerstein

 Ludwig Kraft, 2nd Prince 1806–1823 (1791-1870)
  Friedrich Kraft, 3rd Prince 1823-1842 (1793–1842)
  Karl Friedrich I, 4th Prince 1842–1905 (1840-1905)
 Karl Friedrich II, 5th Prince 1905–1930 (1877-1930)
  Eugen, 6th Prince 1930–1969 (1885-1969), politician
  Karl Friedrich III, 7th Prince 1969–1991 (1917-1991)
 Moritz, 8th Prince 1991–present (born 1946) 
 Karl Eugen, Hereditary Prince of Oettingen-Oettingen and Oettingen-Wallerstein (born 1970)
 Princess Helena (born 1995)
 Prince Johannes (born 1998)
  Prince Eugen (born 2004)
 Prince Ludwig-Maximilian (born 1972)
 Prince Felix (born 2003)
  Prince Dominik (born 2007)
  Prince Friedrich-Alexander (born 1978)
  Prince Kraft Ernst (born 1951)
 Prince Philipp-Karl (born 1983)
  Prince Leopold-Ludwig (born 1987)

Mediatised line of Spielberg

  Johann Aloys III Anton, 4th Prince 1806–1855 (1788–1855)
  Otto I Karl, 5th Prince 1855–1882 (1815–1882)
 Franz Albrecht II, 6th Prince 1882–1916 (1847–1916)
  Emil, 7th Prince 1916–1919 (1850–1919)
  Otto II Joseph, 8th Prince 1919–1952 (1879–1952)
  Aloys Philipp, 9th Prince 1952–1975 (1920–1975)
  Albrecht Ernst, 10th Prince 1975–present (born 1951)
  Franz Albrecht, Hereditary Prince of Oettingen-Oettingen and Oettingen-Spielberg (born 1982)
  Prince Louis-Albrecht of Oettingen-Oettingen and Oettingen-Spielberg (born 2019)

Other important members
 Irmengard of Oettingen, Countess Palatine of the Rhine (c. 1304–1389)
 Elisabeth of Oettingen, Landgravine of Leuchtenberg (c. 1360–1406)
 Wolfgang I of Oettingen, Count of Oettingen-Oettingen (1455-1522)
 Maria Magdalena of Oettingen-Baldern, Margravine of Baden-Baden (1619-1688)
 Maria Dorothea Sophia of Oettingen-Oettingen (1639-1698), second wife of Eberhard III, Duke of Württemberg
 Princess Christine Louise of Oettingen-Oettingen (1671-1747), wife of Louis Rudolph, Duke of Brunswick-Lüneburg. She was the maternal grandmother of Holy Roman Empress Maria Theresa, Tsar Peter II of Russia, Queen Elisabeth Christine of Prussia and Queen Juliane Marie of Denmark and Norway.
 Maria Anna of Oettingen-Spielberg (1693-1729), wife of Joseph Johann Adam, Prince of Liechtenstein
 Princess Gabriele of Oettingen-Oettingen and Oettingen-Spielberg (b. 1953), daughter of the 9th Prince
 Princess Nora of Oettingen-Spielberg (b. 1990), daughter of Albrecht Ernst, Prince of Oettingen-Oettingen and Oettingen-Spielberg. Married 2017, Lord Max Percy, youngest son of Ralph Percy, 12th Duke of Northumberland
 Cleopatra, Hereditary Princess of Oettingen-Oettingen and Oettingen-Spielberg (b. 1987), wife of Franz Albrecht, Hereditary Prince of Oettingen-Oettingen and Oettingen-Spielberg

Residences
The following castles are still owned by the Princes of Oettingen-Spielberg and Oettingen-Wallerstein:

See also
 Oettingen in Bayern

References

External links

 
  genealogie-mittelalter.de
 Website of the Prince of Oettingen-Spielberg
 List of Counts of Oettingen
  Counts of Oettingen in the ADB
  genealogie-mittelalter.de

Bibliography
 Fürstlich Oettingen-Wallerstein'sche Bibliothek (1985) Oettingen-Wallerstein'sche Musiksammlung. München: K. G. Saur (reproduced on 3819 microfiches) 
 Genealogisches Handbuch des Adels, Band IX, C. A. Starke Verlag, 1998, ISBN 3-7980-0816-7 (= Adelslexikon, Gesamtreihe Band 116) (for further references).
 Teresa Neumeyer: Dinkelsbühl. Der ehemalige Landkreis Kommission für bayerische Landesgeschichte München 2018 (= Historischer Atlas von Bayern, 40. Franken I), ISBN 978-3-7696-6562-8.
 Europäische Stammtafeln. Stammtafeln zur Geschichte der europäischen Staaten, Bd. V. Von Frank Baron Freytag von Loringhoven aus dem Nachlass hrsg. von Detlev Schwennicke, Marburg 1978, Tafeln 152–155.
 
 
 Jacob Paul Lang: Materialien zur oettingischen älteren und neueren Geschichte, Bd. 2, Wallerstein 1773.
 Zedlers Grosses vollständiges Universal-Lexikon, Bd. 25, Leipzig und Halle 1740, Sp. 801–820.
 

Swabian noble families
Counties of the Holy Roman Empire
Counts of the Holy Roman Empire
House of Oettingen